Kajal Saini (born 31 August 1994) is an Indian sport shooter. She is from Rohtak and represents Haryana. Her coach is Manoj Kumar. Her current World Rank is 53.

Career
Saini took up shooting while studying in Baba Mast Nath Senior Secondary School in Rohtak.

She has three positions in 50m Rifle and World Cup- Participations three.

 Place 22	1	Rio de Janeiro- Score: 1167 in 2019 
 Place 60	1	Beijing- Score: 1142 in 2019 
 Place 70	1	Munich- Score: 1140	in 2019
She won two medals in 13th 2019 Asian Shooting Championships South Asian Games held in Nepal. In November in Doha she won Gold and Bronze in 14th Asian Shooting championship. She was NCC cadet in Government Women college. She is aspirant for Tokyo Olympic.

References

External links

Living people
1994 births
Indian female sport shooters
21st-century Indian women
21st-century Indian people
ISSF rifle shooters
Sportspeople from Haryana